Berlin Alt-Reinickendorf is a railway station in the Reinickendorf district of Berlin. It is served by S-Bahn line S25. The station, located in the old town of the locality of Reinickendorf, was called Berlin-Reinickendorf until 1994.

References

Sources
Schwandl, R (2003). "Berlin S-Bahn Album".

AltReinickendorf
Alt-Reinickendorf
Alt-Reinickendorf
Berlin AltReinickendorf